Live at the Grammy Museum is the first live acoustic album by heavy metal band Avenged Sevenfold, released on December 8, 2017 on Capitol.

Background 
After receiving a Grammy nomination for the previous year's release The Stage, the band announced in Fall 2017 that they would be holding "intimate conversation about their career and new music" followed by an unplugged set in the Grammy Museum at the Clive Davis Theater in Los Angeles, taking place on October 19, 2017.

In a statement regarding the event the band said, "We're excited about our Grammy nomination so we're releasing a special acoustic album, 'Avenged Sevenfold Live at the GRAMMY Museum',  in the same statement regarding the foundation itself, specifically the proceeds the band continued:

"A portion of the proceeds from this digital-only release will benefit the education initiatives of the GRAMMY Museum, which seek to inspire youth to the enduring qualities and cultural significance of music."

The performance included songs from multiple albums including a cover of The Rolling Stones' "As Tears Go By".

Track listing

Personnel

Avenged Sevenfold
 M. Shadows – lead vocals
 Zacky Vengeance – rhythm acoustic guitar, backing vocals
 Synyster Gates – lead acoustic guitar, backing vocals, co-lead vocals on "As Tears Go By"
 Johnny Christ – acoustic bass guitar
 Brooks Wackerman – drums

Additional musicians
 Papa Gates – additional guitars, sitar on "As Tears Go By"

References

2017 live albums
Avenged Sevenfold albums